The Garden State Parkway (GSP) is a controlled-access toll road that stretches the north–south length of eastern New Jersey from the state's southernmost tip near Cape May north to the New York state line at Montvale. Its name refers to New Jersey's nickname, the "Garden State". The parkway is designated by the New Jersey Department of Transportation (NJDOT) as Route 444, although this designation is unsigned. At its north end, the road becomes the Garden State Parkway Connector, a component of the New York State Thruway system that connects to the Thruway mainline in Ramapo. Most of the highway north of the Raritan River runs through heavily populated areas. Between the Raritan River and the township of Toms River, the highway passes through lighter suburban development, while south of Toms River, the road mostly runs through unspoiled wilderness in the Pine Barrens and swampland.

The parkway was constructed between 1946 and 1957 to connect suburban northern New Jersey with the Jersey Shore resort areas along the Atlantic coast and to alleviate traffic on traditional north–south routes running through each town center, such as U.S. Route 1 (US 1), US 9, and Route 35. During planning and construction of the first segment, the road was to be a toll-free highway designated as the Route 4 Parkway. However, a lack of funding caused the remainder of the parkway to be built as a toll road. The highway has seen many improvements over the years, including the addition and reconstruction of interchanges, bridge replacements, widening of the roadway, and removal of at-grade intersections. Previously, the road had been maintained by an agency known as the New Jersey Highway Authority (NJHA), however in 2003, the agency merged into the New Jersey Turnpike Authority (NJTA), which now maintains the parkway along with the New Jersey Turnpike.

The parkway uses an open system of toll collection with flat-fee tolls collected at 11 toll plazas along the roadway, as well as at several entrances and exits. Tolls can be paid using cash or via the E-ZPass electronic toll collection system. Along the route are 11 service areas, providing food and fuel to travelers. Historically, the road had ten picnic areas along its length, but only one remains open today.

Route description
The Garden State Parkway begins at Route 109 in Cape May County. It runs north along the Jersey Shore, crossing the Great Egg Harbor Bay and passing to the west of Atlantic City. The parkway passes through the sparsely populated Pine Barrens until it reaches the township of Toms River in Ocean County. From here, the road heads into suburban areas. North of Asbury Park, the route splits into a local-express lane configuration, which it maintains through South Amboy. Here, the highway crosses the Raritan River into Woodbridge Township, where it meets the New Jersey Turnpike (Interstate 95 or I-95). North of here, the GSP passes through densely populated communities in Middlesex and Union counties and intersects I-78 near Newark. The parkway eventually passes to the south and east of Paterson and meets I-80 in Saddle Brook. After traversing the suburban northern section of Bergen County, the road enters the state of New York where it becomes the Garden State Parkway Connector, continuing north to the New York State Thruway mainline. 

The parkway serves as a major route connecting North Jersey with all of the state's shore points, and as such, is subject to frequent congestion. The number of lanes on the parkway ranges from four in Cape May, Atlantic, and Bergen counties, to 15 on the Driscoll Bridge. Much of the highway runs closely parallel to, or concurrently with US 9. The NJTA may temporarily reduce the speed limit when special hazards exist. The entire length of the Garden State Parkway carries the unsigned designation of Route 444, and is part of the National Highway System, a network of roads important to the country's economy, defense, and mobility.

Cape May and Atlantic counties

The parkway begins at an at-grade intersection with Route 109 in Lower Township, Cape May County, where Route 109 continues south towards the city of Cape May and west towards US 9 and the Cape May–Lewes Ferry. The GSP runs north as a four-lane controlled-access highway on the Cape May peninsula through the Cape Island Wildlife Management Area, running west of swampland, separating the highway from the Jersey Shore communities. Trees occupy the median and the sides of the road for the next several miles. After passing to the east of Cape May National Golf Club, crossing over Jones Creek, and passing a pond in the median, the highway enters Middle Township and has an interchange with Route 47, which serves The Wildwoods resort area and the community of Rio Grande. North of this point, the parkway crosses over the abandoned Wildwood Branch of the Pennsylvania-Reading Seashore Lines (PRSL), and afterwards, the trees in the median disappear and the highway has a partial interchange with Route 147, which provides access to North Wildwood, Whitesboro, and Burleigh. Crossing into the county seat of Cape May Court House, the median narrows and US 9 appears within yards of the southbound lanes of the parkway as it passes west of the Wildwood Golf and Country Club. The two highways then split apart and the GSP bisects residential areas before reaching an interchange for County Route 657 (CR 657), which serves the Cape Regional Medical Center and the borough of Stone Harbor.

Past this point, the road comes to an interchange for CR 609, which provides access to the Cape May County Park & Zoo and a building complex containing the Cape May County Technical School District. After a southbound entrance ramp from US 9, the parkway leaves Cape May Court House and returns to a desolate wooded setting with a wide tree-filled median. Continuing north, the parkway has an interchange with CR 601, serving the borough of Avalon and Swainton. North of this point, the highway enters Dennis Township and has a partial junction with CR 625, serving Sea Isle City before reaching the Toni Morrison Service Area in the median. Past the service area, the parkway enters Upper Township and reaches the Cape May Toll Plaza northbound immediately before meeting the southern terminus of Route 50, which serves Seaville, at a partial interchange. After passing east of several homes and a golf course, the parkway has the John B. Townsend Shoemaker Holly Picnic Area in the median before it crosses over the abandoned PRSL Ocean City Branch. Continuing north, the highway comes to a diamond interchange with US 9 and CR 623, which serves Ocean City and Marmora. North of this exit, US 9 begins to run concurrently with the GSP, and the two routes run east of the community of Beesleys Point before the median narrows, and they cross the Great Egg Harbor Bay on the Great Egg Harbor Bridge.

The highway surfaces into the city of Somers Point, Atlantic County, where the southbound roadway has the Great Egg Toll Plaza before US 9 leaves the parkway at a partial junction. Past this point, the median widens and the parkway passes west of the Greate Bay Country Club and some homes before a partial interchange with Laurel Drive, which provides access to Somers Point and Ocean City. After passing to the west of more residences, the median briefly becomes a Jersey barrier as the route crosses the Patcong Creek into Egg Harbor Township, where developments begin to appear on the west side of the highway. Eventually, the parkway crosses into uninhabited area again before heading into a commercial area and widening to six lanes. Here, the road has a junction with US 40, US 322, and CR 563, marking the first of three interchanges with roads that serve Atlantic City, located to the east. The median then transitions to a Jersey barrier and the parkway passes over the abandoned PRSL Newfield Branch before a partial junction with CR 608 and a cloverleaf interchange with the controlled-access Atlantic City Expressway (which heads west toward Philadelphia), where the northbound and southbound roadways split apart again. Upon leaving the commercial area, the highway passes to the east of Atlantic City International Airport and crosses over a flume of the Atlantic City Reservoir, which has a basin on each side of the highway. Continuing north, the highway enters Galloway Township and passes over NJ Transit's Atlantic City Line before it comes to a partial interchange with US 30, serving the city of Absecon. North of this exit, the median is home to the Frank Sinatra Service Area, which also has a barrack of the New Jersey State Police. Immediately north of the service plaza, the parkway has an interchange with CR 561, serving the community of Pomona. The parkway then enters the sparsely populated Pine Barrens, passing to the east of Stockton University and reaching a junction with CR 575/CR 561 Alt. Past this point, the road turns northeast and crosses into the city of Port Republic as it winds north into the uninhabited Port Republic Wildlife Management Area. With some occasional development appearing along the sides of the road, the median narrows to a Jersey barrier as US 9 merges back onto the parkway, along with the Pine Barrens Byway, and the three routes cross the Mullica River.

Burlington and Ocean counties

The highway surfaces into Bass River Township, Burlington County, and US 9 and the Pine Barrens Byway depart at a partial interchange. Continuing northeast past the community of New Gretna, the parkway passes over US 9 with no access before crossing the Bass River and the median widens and contains a maintenance yard. Past this point, the median temporarily narrows again as the northbound lanes have the New Gretna Toll Plaza. Crossing northward through Bass River State Forest, the six-lane highway becomes desolate as it enters Little Egg Harbor Township, Ocean County. Here, the GSP interchanges with CR 539, which serves Tuckerton, before entering Eagleswood Township, where it crosses over Westecunk Creek and passes to the west of Eagles Nest Airport. Afterwards, the parkway enters Stafford Township where development along the road begins to increase. Here, the highway has an interchange with Route 72, which provides access to Manahawkin and Long Beach Island. The parkway then forms a border between residential neighborhoods to the west and forest to the east before passing to the east of a golf course and entering Barnegat Township, where the concentration of houses shifts to the east. After an interchange with CR 554, the parkway passes by residential neighborhoods on both sides of the highway before the median shortly narrows and the southbound roadway has the Barnegat Toll Plaza. Now in Ocean Township, the parkway meets CR 532 and crosses over Oyster Creek before entering Lacey Township, where it crosses the south, middle, and north branches of the Forked River before reaching an interchange with CR 614, serving the community of Forked River, and the Celia Cruz Service Area in the median.

Father north, the road crosses over Cedar Creek and enters Berkeley Township, passing west of a golf course and Central Regional High School while traversing Double Trouble State Park. The route then crosses into the borough of Beachwood and passes west of several homes before entering the borough of South Toms River, where the median narrows and the parkway becomes concurrent with US 9 once again at a junction with CR 530. After crossing the Toms River and entering the township of Toms River, the highway passes west of the Toms River Bus Terminal serving NJ Transit buses. Past this point, the road crosses the abandoned Conrail Barnegat Branch and reaches an exit for CR 527 before passing trees and reaching a cloverleaf interchange with Route 37, which provides access to Lakehurst, Seaside Heights, and Island Beach State Park. After heading northwest between trees on the west and neighborhoods on the east, the GSP turns northeast as the median widens and contains a maintenance yard, and US 9 leaves the parkway at a junction with Route 166. Past the interchange, the parkway reaches the bi-directional Toms River Toll Plaza and passes by lighter suburban development in addition to parkland, with Ocean County College to the east. Upon entering Lakewood Township, the parkway has an interchange with Route 70, serving Brick Township and Point Pleasant Beach to the east; this interchange also serves CR 528. Running along the border of Lakewood and Brick townships, the route has an interchange with CR 549 before crossing the South Branch Metedeconk River and passing over Route 88 with no access. Now entirely within Brick Township, the route crosses the North Branch Metedeconk River and reaches a second exit for CR 549, where a pedestrian bridge for the Brick Park and Ride, located to the east, passes over the parkway. North of this interchange, the road widens to eight lanes and passes west of a solar farm.

Monmouth and Middlesex counties

Upon entering Wall Township, Monmouth County, the southbound lanes have a truck inspection area and the parkway passes west of Brick Township Reservoir through woods. The parkway crosses the Manasquan River and passes under the Capital to Coast Trail before reaching a large interchange near Allaire State Park. The interchange includes a pair of collector-distributor roads and serves the eastern terminus of I-195 (which runs west across Central Jersey towards Trenton), Route 34 (which runs southeast towards Point Pleasant Beach), and Route 138 (which runs east towards Belmar). A park and ride is present in the southeastern cloverleaf with Route 138. Passing to the west of Shark River Park, the median contains the Judy Blume Service Area, which provides a park and ride for commuters and access to CR 18. The parkway then enters Tinton Falls and has exits for Route 33, which runs east towards Bradley Beach and west towards Freehold Township, and Route 66, which heads east towards Asbury Park. Soon afterwards, the parkway passes to the west of the Jersey Shore Premium Outlets and has a partial exit for CR 16, where the road widens to ten lanes. North of this point, the parkway reaches the northbound Asbury Park Toll Plaza.

Immediately north of the toll barrier, the road divides into a local-express lane configuration with two express and three local lanes in each direction. The parkway passes to the east of a solar farm before reaching an interchange with the Route 18 freeway and Route 36, which head north towards New Brunswick and east towards Long Branch, respectively. The connector road from the parkway to the terminus of Route 36 and CR 51 is designated by NJDOT as Route 444S. North of the interchange, the GSP passes over the Southern Secondary railroad line operated by the Delaware and Raritan River Railroad and bisects residential neighborhoods before crossing the Swimming River into Middletown, where the road has an interchange with CR 520, which contains a park and ride and serves Red Bank and Lincroft. The parkway then passes over Normandy Road, which serves as a road and railroad link between the two sections of Naval Weapons Station Earle. Continuing northwest past houses and parks, the route has an interchange with CR 52 as it enters Holmdel Township, where it serves the PNC Bank Arts Center and the New Jersey Vietnam Veterans' Memorial. Upon entering Hazlet, the parkway crosses NJ Transit's North Jersey Coast Line before reaching an interchange for Route 35 and Route 36, which serves Keyport. At this point, the express roadway in each direction gains a third lane. Immediately north of here is a southbound exit and entrance at CR 3, where the parkway briefly enters Aberdeen Township and passes over the Matawan Creek before crossing the North Jersey Coast Line for a second time. Upon entering Old Bridge Township, Middlesex County, and reaching an interchange for CR 689 serving Matawan, the highway enters Cheesequake State Park.

After crossing the Cheesequake Creek near a marina and leaving the park, the road enters Sayreville and has the Jon Bon Jovi Service Area in the median, with access to both the express and local lanes of the highway. Passing to the southwest of South Amboy, the parkway has a partial interchange with US 9 and passes over Conrail Shared Assets Operations' (CSAO) Amboy Secondary line. After a northbound entrance and southbound exit at CR 670, the lanes, now as a 4-3-3-4 configuration, merge as they cross the abandoned Raritan River Railroad and reach the Raritan Toll Plaza southbound. North of the toll barrier is an exit for Chevalier Avenue; all southbound vehicles exiting here must have an E-ZPass transponder. Paralleling US 9 and Route 35, the parkway becomes 15 lanes as it crosses the Raritan River on the Driscoll Bridge, the widest motor vehicle bridge in the world. On the bridge, the northbound lanes are divided into two roadways; only the eastern roadway has access to exit 127, an interchange for US 9 and the Route 440 freeway, providing access to the Outerbridge Crossing to Staten Island. Just north of exit 127 in Woodbridge Township, the parkway runs in between the northbound and southbound lanes of US 9. After passing under CSAO's Perth Amboy Running Track, US 9 splits off to the east and the parkway reaches an interchange with the New Jersey Turnpike (I-95). Running northwest through Woodbridge Township as a ten-lane roadway, the highway has a junction with US 1 and crosses under CSAO's Port Reading Secondary line as it enters the community of Iselin, passing to the east of several corporate offices. Immediately after passing under Amtrak's Northeast Corridor east of the Metropark station serving Amtrak and NJ Transit's Northeast Corridor Line, the GSP has an interchange with Route 27 (Lincoln Highway), which serves Rahway to the northeast. North of this point, the parkway curves northeast through densely populated neighborhoods, passing the Colonia South and Colonia North service areas.

Union and Essex counties

Crossing into Clark, Union County, the highway continues to pass through dense neighborhoods as a ten-lane roadway with a Jersey barrier. After crossing the Robinson's Branch Reservoir and passing an interchange with CR 613, the southbound lanes have access to a maintenance yard. The highway then passes west of a park and Winfield Township before crossing the Rahway River into Cranford, where there is a junction with CR 607 and CR 615. After passing west of a business park and over CSAO's Lehigh Line and the inactive Rahway Valley Railroad, the parkway crosses NJ Transit's Raritan Valley Line and reaches a junction with Route 28, which serves Roselle Park to the east. Upon entering Kenilworth, the highway passes many businesses before the road meets CR 509, passes to the east of Galloping Hill Golf Course, and enters Union Township, where the parkway has a junction with CR 619. Immediately afterwards, the road comes to an interchange with US 22 and Route 82 serving Hillside, where the GSP briefly runs in between the carriageways of US 22 and the Union Watersphere appears on the east side of the parkway. Here, the parkway narrows to eight lanes, and the northbound lanes have access to the Whitney Houston Service Area. After the service area, the road crosses the Elizabeth River and briefly enters Hillside, where it reaches the northbound Union Toll Plaza before an interchange with I-78.

Running northeast into Irvington, Essex County, the highway passes west of a park and east of many houses before reaching a pair of interchanges for local roads and passing through a short tunnel underneath a parking lot for Irvington Bus Terminal, serving NJ Transit buses. North of this point, the parkway gains frontage roads in each direction, which are mostly lined by residences. The frontage road for the northbound lanes is called Eastern Parkway, and the frontage road for the southbound lanes is called Western Parkway. After an interchange with CR 510, the frontage roads end, and the parkway briefly enters the city of Newark where it bisects Holy Sepulchre Cemetery, the northern end of which is in East Orange. After leaving the cemetery, the highway regains frontage roads which are known as Oraton Parkway. After passing East Orange General Hospital's Eastern Pavilion, the parkway comes to an interchange with I-280 and CR 508, which serve Downtown Newark. At the interchange, the GSP loses a lane in each direction and passes under NJ Transit's Morris & Essex Lines near East Orange station. The parkway continues to run in between frontage roads containing many houses before passing west of several apartment buildings and hospitals and crossing the abandoned Orange Branch of the New York and Greenwood Lake Railway. Winding into Bloomfield as a six-lane roadway, the GSP crosses NJ Transit's Montclair-Boonton Line and has an interchange with the Newark-Pompton Turnpike (CR 506 Spur), where the frontage roads end. After passing under Norfolk Southern's Boonton Line and reaching an exit for CR 506, the parkway enters a more suburban area and the southbound parkway has the Essex Toll Plaza. The highway then briefly enters Nutley before crossing back into Bloomfield, where the Jersey barrier becomes a grassy median and the parkway reaches a diamond interchange for CR 655 serving Montclair and passing the Larry Doby and Connie Chung service areas to the west of the Upper Montclair Country Club.

Passaic and Bergen counties

The parkway then crosses into Passaic County and the city of Clifton, where it reaches an interchange with Route 3. At this point, the space between the northbound and southbound roadways contains the Allwood Road Park and Ride serving NJ Transit buses. After passing under a set of power lines and bisecting a residential area, the route has an incomplete interchange with US 46. Immediately north, the parkway meets the southern terminus of the Route 19 freeway, which heads north towards the city of Paterson. Past this point, the highway curves northeast and passes over NJ Transit's Main Line before the median transitions to a Jersey barrier and the highway has a northbound exit and southbound entrance at CR 702, serving the city of Passaic. The parkway heads northeast past many homes before heading into a business district and crossing Norfolk Southern's Passaic Spur line. After passing many more residences near the route, the parkway reaches a partial interchange with the southern terminus of Route 20. Immediately afterwards, the parkway crosses the Passaic River and enters Elmwood Park, Bergen County, where it comes to a second interchange with US 46, serving Garfield. Passing more homes, followed by several businesses, the highway then passes over the New York, Susquehanna and Western Railway's New Jersey Subdivision line and under NJ Transit's Bergen County Line before reaching an interchange with I-80 and the northbound Bergen Toll Plaza in Saddle Brook.

Continuing northeast, the road passes through Saddle River County Park and crosses the Saddle River tributary into Rochelle Park. After leaving the park, it crosses a pair of interchanges for Route 208 and Route 4 as it enters Paramus near the Westfield Garden State Plaza shopping mall. North of Route 4, the parkway passes east of the Arcola Country Club and runs closely parallel with Route 17 before interchanging with it. Past this interchange, the median becomes grass-filled. After passing east of businesses and west of homes, the parkway passes in between the Paramus Park shopping mall and New Bridge Medical Center before reaching a junction with CR 80, which serves Oradell and has a park and ride. After bisecting residential neighborhoods, the parkway has a partial junction with CR 110 before entering Washington Township where the southbound lanes have the Pascack Valley Toll Plaza – the northernmost toll plaza on the highway. North of the toll plaza, the median becomes substantially wider and trees begin to appear within it. The Garden State Parkway finally narrows from six to four lanes at the exit for CR 502, serving Westwood and Emerson. Winding through the Pascack Valley region of Bergen County past many homes and woodland, the parkway briefly enters Hillsdale before entering Woodcliff Lake, where there is a northbound exit and southbound entrance for Chestnut Ridge Road, which is accessed via CR S73 and serves the borough of Saddle River. The parkway then enters Montvale, where it reaches the James Gandolfini Service Area, the northernmost service area on the road. Immediately north is an exit for CR 94 serving Park Ridge; this is the northernmost exit of the Garden State Parkway, which crosses into the state of New York soon afterwards. From there, the route becomes the Garden State Parkway Connector, a component of the New York State Thruway system, which heads north toward the Thruway mainline (I-87/I-287) in Nanuet.

History

Early history 
Following World War II, traffic increased substantially on highways along the New Jersey coast. Due to the high traffic volume and presence of numerous traffic lights, it took motorists over three hours to travel between Paterson and Atlantic City. In 1946, plans were made to construct a high-speed parkway to provide a bypass of Route 4, which, prior to 1953, ran from Cape May to the George Washington Bridge by way of Paterson, largely following present-day US 1, US 9, and Route 35. This parkway would be constructed using state funds and be known as the Route 4 Parkway. Construction began in 1947, and the first section to open was a  section between Route 35 in Woodbridge Township, Middlesex County, and Centennial Avenue in Cranford, Union County, which opened in stages by November 1, 1950. This was soon extended north to Union Township. This segment, which now runs between exits 129 and 140, can be distinguished from the rest of the GSP by the stone facing on the overpasses. However, due to a lack of funds, construction of the Route 4 Parkway stalled. The solution was for the state to establish the New Jersey Highway Authority (NJHA) in 1952 to oversee construction and operation of the remainder of the parkway as a self-liquidating toll road from Cape May to the New York state line. Literature from the time indicates that the parkway would become toll-free once bonds used for its construction were paid off. However, this speculation never became a reality.

The landscape architect and engineer in charge of the newly named Garden State Parkway was Gilmore David Clarke of the engineering firm Parsons Brinckerhoff, who had worked with Robert Moses on the parkway systems around New York City. Clarke's design prototypes for the parkway combined the example of the Pennsylvania Turnpike, a model of efficiency with parallels in the German Autobahn routes of the 1930s, with the Merritt Parkway model that stressed a planted "green belt" for beauty. Both design models featured wide planted medians to prevent head-on collisions and mask the glare of oncoming headlights. The Garden State Parkway was designed to have a natural feel. Many trees were planted, and the only signs were those for exits—there were no distracting billboards. Most of the signs were constructed from wood, or a dark-brown metal, instead of the chrome bars used on most other highways. The guardrails were also made from wood and dark metal. Most early overpasses were stone, but were later changed to concrete, with green rails and retro etchings, popular around the 1950s and 1960s. The parkway was designed to curve gently throughout its length so that drivers would remain alert and not fall asleep at the wheel.
  
  
The bridge carrying the parkway over the Raritan River opened on July 30, 1954, and the bridge over the Passaic River opened on May 26, 1955. This extended the parkway's northern terminus to US 46 in present-day Elmwood Park. On July 1 of that year, the portion of the highway from US 46 to Route 17 in Paramus opened. Before the Great Egg Harbor Bridge was completed in 1956, the parkway temporarily detoured onto US 9 and over the Beesley's Point Bridge. That bridge was closed in 2004 and demolished in 2014; US 9 now detours onto the parkway instead.

The final portion of the parkway to open from Paramus to the New York state line near Montvale was originally proposed as part of a northern extension of Route 101, a highway that was intended to run from Kearny to Hackensack. The extension, Route S101, would have continued northward from Hackensack to the state line via Paramus. Route 101 was never built, and only the Paramus–Montvale segment saw any later construction. This segment of the parkway opened in 1957 along with the Garden State Parkway Connector of the New York State Thruway.

In December 1957, D. Louis Tonti, the executive director of the New Jersey Highway Authority, announced plans to construct the missing ramps at exit 154 in Clifton. These ramps would connect drivers from US 46 eastbound to the parkway northbound, and from the parkway southbound to US 46 westbound. In May 1958, the project bid went to Thomas Nichol Company, Inc. of Farmingdale, and construction began immediately. The new ramps opened in December, and the toll booths on the ramps opened the following month. The total cost of the project was $2.25 million, which was half a million higher than the original estimate. During 1959, traffic counts noted 1.5 million cars used the new ramps at exit 154.

On February 1, 1961, the NJHA outlawed motorcycles, scooters, and bicycles from the entire length of the parkway. The ban was enacted after a year involving 20 motorcycle accidents and two fatalities. Motorcyclists who used the highway faced a fine of $200 or a 30-day jail sentence. However, the motorcycle ban was lifted on November 1, 1975, after pressure from entrepreneur Malcolm Forbes and other motorcyclists.

In June 1961, the Highway Authority announced plans to construct a new interchange at Red Hill Road in the Holmdel–Middletown area. This new interchange would help relieve local congestion with the opening of Bell Labs and more industrial parks in the area. As part of the plan, the ramp at exit 116 would be closed to non-emergency automobile traffic, despite disapproval from locals. On December 14, the Highway Authority made an appropriation of $50,000 for the engineering work for the new interchange. Construction began in July 1962, and it was completed by December.

On December 23, 1963, the ramps connecting the parkway and I-80 opened to traffic. Construction of these ramps cost $4.5 million, and it replaced the preexisting interchange at Midland Avenue. Toll booths were constructed on the northbound exit and the southbound entrance to the parkway from I-80.

On March 8, 1965, the northbound exit and southbound entrance at exit 30 in Somers Point was permanently closed, with traffic directed to use the intersection with US 9, which later became exit 29,  to the south. The interchange at exit 30 was reconstructed with toll plazas on the southbound exit and northbound entrance.

In May 1966, the borough of Paramus and the New Jersey Highway Authority agreed to a complete replacement of exit 165 (Ridgewood Avenue) to improve safety and capacity. The project, costing $3.7 million (equivalent to $ in ), would expand the two-ramp interchange to eight ramps, creating a collector-distributor road to serve both ramps. Construction on the new interchange began almost immediately, with the new southbound ramps opening on November 30, 1966. A month later, on December 29, the dual ramps on the northbound direction opened, and the tolls went into effect on February 13.  On January 6, 1967, the ramps at exit 166 were closed to traffic, but they reopened in September.

In early 1967, the parkway was expanded from four to six lanes between the Bergen Toll Plaza in Saddle Brook and the interchange with Route 4 in Paramus. The following year, the road was expanded to six lanes between Route 17 and Ridgewood Avenue/Oradell Avenue, and in 1969, the section between Route 4 and Route 17 was widened. This widening made the entire  stretch from Ocean County to Paramus at least six lanes wide.

The parkway was planned to be the southern terminus of the unbuilt Driscoll Expressway, a  toll road that was planned in the early 1970s to run from Toms River to the New Jersey Turnpike in South Brunswick; this plan was abandoned in 1977. The parkway was also planned to be the southern terminus for Route 55 at milepost 19. This was canceled after the conclusion that the highway ran through too many wetland areas. The idea has since been revisited after frequent traffic jams on Route 47.

21st century 

On September 25, 2002, construction began on a new span of the Driscoll Bridge just west of the original spans, consisting of seven lanes and emergency shoulders. On May 3, 2006, all traffic was shifted onto the new span, and the original two were closed for rehabilitation. On May 20, 2009, all northbound traffic was shifted back onto the original spans, and the new one was made exclusively for southbound traffic.

On July 9, 2003, Governor Jim McGreevey's plan to merge the operating organizations of the Garden State Parkway and the New Jersey Turnpike into one agency, the New Jersey Turnpike Authority (NJTA), was completed.

In May 2005, Governor Richard Codey announced plans for a widening of the parkway between exit 63 in Stafford Township and exit 80 in the borough of South Toms River from two to three lanes in both directions. However, the NJTA later made plans to widen the parkway from exit 80 all the way south to exit 30 in the city of Somers Point. The project was divided into three phases. The first phase from exits 80 to 63 was complete in May 2011. The second phase from exits 63 to 48 was complete in November 2014.  The third phase from exits 48 to 30 was completed in 2018, and included construction of new bridges across the Mullica River from the city of Port Republic to Bass River Township.

In 2008, a $150 million project began to add new ramps at the interchange with I-78, supplying the missing movements between the two highways. Previously, the parkway northbound did not have an exit to I-78 westbound, and the parkway southbound did not have an exit to I-78 eastbound. The lack of connections was due to the cancellation of the extension of I-278 (which would have connected northbound parkway traffic with I-78 westbound) and Route 75 (which would have connected southbound parkway traffic with I-78 eastbound via I-280). In April 2008, the New Jersey Department of Transportation (NJDOT) awarded the project contract to the engineering firm Gannett Fleming for the design, and to Union Paving & Construction Company for building the ramps. The ramp connecting the parkway northbound with I-78 westbound opened on September 16, 2009 with a ribbon cutting ceremony led by Governor Jon Corzine, and the ramp connecting the parkway southbound with I-78 eastbound opened on December 10, 2010.

In April 2011, New Jersey Transportation Commissioner James Simpson announced the NJTA was considering allowing trucks on the northern portion of the Garden State Parkway. However, the idea was quickly abandoned after the agency found the road had engineering concerns that would not accommodate trucks on this segment.

As originally built, in Cape May County, the parkway had three traffic lights (at exits 9, 10, and 11), but these were eliminated in 2014–2015, with construction of three overpasses in Cape May Court House. Construction began in early 2013, years after the scheduled start date due to a wetland mitigation plan that had not been approved by the federal government. The project cost $125 million, and was complete by September 2015.

The southbound bridge over the Great Egg Harbor Bay was replaced with a wider span parallel to the older span as part of a $79.3 million project. Construction began in 2013 and continued into 2019. The new southbound bridge temporarily carried both northbound and southbound traffic so the northbound bridge could receive new decking and strengthening. The project also included the addition of a mixed-use walkway along the new southbound span that will allow pedestrian and bicycle connections between Upper Township and Somers Point. However, NJDOT and the city of Somers Point blocked the path from opening until it could be linked with an existing path leading to Ocean City. In March 2020, NJDOT announced that the path was set to open on May 6, but it did not open until July 8.

On July 22, 2014, the NJTA filed a federal lawsuit against Jersey Boardwalk Pizza, a pizza chain in Florida, for using a logo too similar to the signs for the Garden State Parkway. Federal Judge William Martini dismissed the suit on March 26, 2015.

In June 2018, an improvement project began at the interchange with I-280 and CR 508 (Central Avenue). The project involved widening the entrance ramp to the parkway southbound from one to two lanes and adding a second deceleration lane on the parkway northbound. The toll plaza on the northbound exit ramp was removed as part of the project. To accommodate the wider roadway, the overpass carrying Central Avenue over the parkway is being rebuilt. Five nearby bridges are also being rehabilitated as part of the project. The project cost approximately $63 million and was completed in August 2022.

The New Jersey Turnpike Authority has plans to close exit 30 in Somers Point, which connects to Laurel Drive, a residential street that leads to US 9 and becomes Route 52, an access road to Ocean City. With the closure of exit 30, exit 29 will be converted to a full interchange to redirect traffic heading to Ocean City from points north along US 9 and CR 559 to reach Route 52. The planned closure of exit 30 is being made in order to reduce summertime traffic congestion along the parkway from vehicles exiting at the interchange along with reducing summertime traffic levels along Laurel Drive. The proposed closure of exit 30 and conversion of exit 29 to a full interchange has received opposition from officials in Somers Point and Ocean City along with residents along CR 559 fearing increased traffic congestion.

On March 24, 2020, the NJTA temporarily suspended cash toll collection because of the COVID-19 pandemic. Drivers without E-ZPass transponders had their license plates photographed at the toll plazas and were sent bills in the mail. Cash collection resumed on May 19 of that year.

Tolls

The Garden State Parkway uses an open system of tolling in which flat-rate tolls are collected at numerous toll plazas placed along the mainline and at certain interchanges. This contrasts with the New Jersey Turnpike, which uses a closed system in which a motorist receives a ticket with the toll rates at the highway's entrance, and turns in the ticket along with the toll upon exiting at toll gates. Tolls can be paid by using cash or the E-ZPass electronic toll collection system.

As of January 1, 2023, the standard car toll is $1.05 for cash and $1.01 for E-ZPass on the main road at two-way toll plazas and $2.10 for cash and $2.02 for E-ZPass at one-way toll plazas. Some entrances and exits require a toll of either $0.75, $1.05, $1.45, or $2.10 for cash and $0.70, $1.01, $1.39, or $2.02 for E-ZPass.

There are three different lane types at the toll plazas. However, not all plazas have every type of lane at all times.

The first type is full-service lanes. These lanes are staffed and toll collectors can provide change and receipts to drivers. 

The second type is exact-change lanes. In these lanes, motorists deposit coins in a toll basket and each coin is mechanically counted. Payment of tolls in exact-change lanes has been enforced by photo since 2011. The Union Toll Plaza was the first to use an automated toll-collection machine; a plaque commemorating this event includes the first quarter collected at its toll booths. Historically, these lanes also accepted tokens, and were common on main roadway toll plazas. However, in September 2018, exact-change lanes were discontinued at mainline toll plazas; they continue to be used for exit and entrance ramp toll plazas.

The third type of lane is dedicated for vehicles with E-ZPass tags. Some plazas also feature Express E-ZPass lanes, allowing drivers to bypass the toll plaza at highway speeds. E-ZPass is also accepted in full-service lanes.   

Tokens, available for purchase at full-service toll plaza lanes, were introduced in 1981 at a price of $10 for a roll of 40 tokens; as the toll was $0.25 at the time, most drivers continued to use quarters. However, when the toll was increased to $0.35 in 1989, rolls were priced at 30 tokens for $10; between the slight discount and the convenience of using a single coin, tokens gained in popularity. There were also larger bus tokens, primarily for use by Atlantic City-bound buses. As E-ZPass became more widespread, tokens were phased out. Token sales were discontinued on January 1, 2002, and they were no longer accepted effective January 1, 2009.

E-ZPass was first installed at the Pascack Valley Toll Plaza in December 1999, and the system was expanded across the entire road by August 2000. Beginning on November 19, 2001, at each mainline toll plaza, E-ZPass customers were charged the approximate token rate of $0.33 during peak hours, or $0.30 during off-peak hours instead of $0.35, the cash toll rate at the time. However, due to tremendous cost overruns in implementing the E-ZPass system on New Jersey's toll highways, the discount was eliminated the next year. E-ZPass discounts continue to be available for off-peak travel, senior citizens, drivers of green vehicles, and trailers.

To reduce congestion, 10 of the 11 toll plazas on the roadway were converted into one-way plazas between 2004 and 2010. The Cape May (in Upper Township), Great Egg (in Somers Point), New Gretna (in Bass River Township), Barnegat (in Barnegat Township),  Asbury Park (in Tinton Falls), Raritan (in Sayreville), Union (in Hillside), Essex (in Bloomfield), Bergen (in Saddle Brook), and Pascack Valley (in Washington Township) toll plazas were among these. The tolls at these plazas were doubled upon conversion. The Toms River Toll Plaza (in Toms River) is the only location on the parkway mainline where a toll is still collected in both directions.

On September 27, 2022, the NJTA awarded a $914 million contract to TransCore to convert the parkway into an all-electronic toll road, eliminating the toll booths in the process. Although the agreement has been made, the Turnpike Authority has no set date on when the conversion will be completed.

Picnic areas

One of the objectives of the parkway was to become a state park its entire length, and its users would enjoy park-like aesthetics with minimal intrusion of urban scenery. Along the ride, users were permitted to stop and picnic along the roadway to further enjoy the relaxation qualities the parkway had to offer. All picnic areas had tall trees that provided shade and visual isolation from the roadway. Grills, benches, running water, and restrooms were provided. Over time as the parkway transformed into a road of commerce, the picnic areas were closed for a variety of reasons. Their ramp terminals became insufficient to accommodate the high-speed mainline traffic and in addition to the decreasing number of users, the picnic areas were becoming more effective as maintenance yards and were converted as such or closed altogether.

The one remaining picnic area, John B. Townsend Shoemaker Holly in Upper Township, is closed from dusk to dawn. Posted signs within the picnic area prohibit fires and camping.

There were ten operational picnic areas:

Services

Service areas 

All service areas are located in the center median, unless otherwise noted.

In the 1950s, four petroleum companies were hired to provide gasoline and vehicular necessities—Esso, Texaco, Atlantic and Cities Service. The Cities Service company was the petroleum provider at Monmouth, Forked River, Atlantic City (Absecon at the time) and Ocean View (Seaville at the time) and offered a service where female employees were hired for those service area showrooms, wore uniforms and were known as the Park-ettes. Their duties included providing directions and other information to motorists as well as rendering odd bits of service such as sewing a missing button on a patron's coat.

On July 27, 2021, the New Jersey Turnpike Authority unanimously voted in favor of renaming the service areas along the Garden State Parkway after New Jerseyans who were inducted into the New Jersey Hall of Fame.

On January 2, 2022, two service areas that were operated by McDonald's in Brookdale and Union were closed after their contract expired in 2021. These services areas will be replaced by 2023.

Emergency assistance
On the Garden State Parkway, the emergency assistance number is #GSP, which is #477 in number form. Towing and roadside assistance are provided from authorized garages. The New Jersey State Police is the primary police agency that handles calls for service on the parkway. Other emergency services such as fire and first aid are usually handled by the jurisdictions in which that section of the parkway passes.

Exit list
The parkway was the first highway in the United States to use mileage-based exit numbers. Historically, the exit numbers on the northbound and southbound roadways were not symmetrical. The New Jersey Highway Authority considered each as a separate road and as a result, many exits had non-matching numbers.

See also

References

External links

New Jersey Turnpike Authority & Garden State Parkway Official Website
History of the Garden State Parkway
  Straight Line Diagram
Photos of the Garden State Parkway
New Jersey Expressways and Tollways
Garden State Parkway (NJ 444) (Greater New York Roads)

 
Limited-access roads in New Jersey
Parkways in the United States
State highways in New Jersey
Toll roads in New Jersey
Transportation in Atlantic County, New Jersey
Transportation in Bergen County, New Jersey
Transportation in Burlington County, New Jersey
Transportation in Cape May County, New Jersey
Transportation in Essex County, New Jersey
Transportation in Middlesex County, New Jersey
Transportation in Monmouth County, New Jersey
Transportation in Passaic County, New Jersey
Transportation in the Pine Barrens (New Jersey)
Transportation in Union County, New Jersey
Transportation in Ocean County, New Jersey
U.S. Route 9